Southern bayberry is a common name for several plants and may refer to:

Myrica caroliniensis, native to southeastern North America
Myrica cerifera, native to North and Central America and the Caribbean